The Rockford Riverdawgs are a semi-professional basketball team and a member of the Independent Basketball Association (IBA).

History 
Rockford are one of six original members of the IBA. Based in Rockford, Illinois, the Riverdawgs played their home games at the Clinton Sports Complex in nearby Loves Park for two seasons. For their third IBA season the team moved to the Patriots' Gateway Center in Rockford.

The Riverdawgs went on hiatus after the 2013–14 season. They are scheduled to return to the IBA in 2016.

Season results

References

External links
Rockford Riverdawgs website

2011 establishments in Illinois
Basketball teams established in 2011
Basketball teams in Illinois
Independent Basketball Association teams
Riverdawgs